Nawadih is a village in Satgawan block of Koderma District in the Indian state of Jharkhand.

Demographics 
The primary languages are Khortha and Hindi.

Geography 
It is located 59 km East of Koderma, 200  km from State capital Ranchi.

Nawadih is surrounded by Sakri River in North and East, Khutta towards South and Tamoriya in the West.

Jhumri Tilaiya, Nawada and Ranchi are the nearby cities.

References 

Villages in Koderma district